The Bolshoy Anyuy ("Great Anyuy") is a river in the Kolyma basin in Far East Siberia. Administratively most of the basin of the Bolshoy Anyuy and its tributaries belong to the Chukotka Autonomous Okrug of Russia.

Geography
It flows roughly westwards and passes through the sparsely populated areas of Chukotka, its valley forming the southern border of the Anyuy Range.

History

In 1650, Mikhail Stadukhin and Semyon Motora found a portage from the upper Bolshoy Anyuy to the upper Anadyr (probably its Yablon branch).  This became the main cossack route from the Kolyma to the Pacific.

References

External links
 
  

Rivers of Chukotka Autonomous Okrug
Rivers of the Sakha Republic